Merta City railway station is a major railway station in Nagaur district, Rajasthan. Its code is MEC. It serves Merta City. The station consists of three platforms. The platforms are not well sheltered. It lacks many facilities including water and sanitation.

References

Railway stations in Nagaur district
Jodhpur railway division